The 2006–07 Drexel Dragons men's basketball team represented Drexel University during the 2006–07 NCAA Division I men's basketball season. The Dragons, led by 6th year head coach Bruiser Flint, played their home games at the Daskalakis Athletic Center and were members of the Colonial Athletic Association.

Roster

Schedule

|-
!colspan=9 style="background:#F8B800; color:#002663;"| Regular season
|-

|-
!colspan=9 style="background:#F8B800; color:#002663;"| CAA Regular Season

|-
!colspan=9 style="background:#F8B800; color:#002663;"| CAA tournament

|-
!colspan=9 style="background:#F8B800; color:#002663;"| NIT

Rankings

Awards
Chaz Crawford
CAA Defensive Player of the Year
CAA All-Defensive Team
CAA Player of the Week

Frank Elegar
CAA All-Conference Second Team
CAA All-Tournament Team
CAA Player of the Week (3)

Bashir Mason
CAA All-Conference Third Team
CAA All-Defensive Team
CAA Player of the Week

Scott Rodgers
CAA All-Academic Second Team

References

Drexel Dragons men's basketball seasons
Drexel
2006 in sports in Pennsylvania
2007 in sports in Pennsylvania